Ihasalu Bay is bay in Harju County, Estonia.

Muuga Bay is part of Ihasalu Bay.

The bay's maximum depth is 85 m.

References

Bays of Estonia
Harju County